Osmolin Radio Tower ( Polish: SLR Osmolin) is a 100 metre tall radio tower built of lattice steel at Osmolin, Poland at . Osmolin Radio Tower is used for directional radio services.

See also
 List of towers

References 

Towers in Poland
Zgierz County
Buildings and structures in Łódź Voivodeship